The Marburg Open is a professional tennis tournament played on outdoor red clay courts. It is currently part of the Association of Tennis Professionals (ATP) Challenger Tour. It is held annually in Marburg, Germany as a Challenger since 2010 (later as a Futures).

Past finals

Singles

Doubles

External links
 Official website
 ITF search

 
ATP Challenger Tour
Hard court tennis tournaments
Tennis tournaments in Germany